Music Waste is an annual music, art, and comedy festival held in Vancouver, British Columbia, Canada.

History

It began in 1994 as a protest against the entry fees of the corporate-sponsored New Music West festival. Since the initial one night stand against the corporate-sponsored New Music West festival, Music Waste has become an integral part of the Vancouver music scene, highlighting the most innovative and exciting bands of Vancouver and surrounding areas. To make the festival as accessible as possible, all of the shows cost a maximum of $5 and are held at venues within walking distance.

From 2004 to 2008, Music Waste had been organized by Only, who also printed a festival guide featuring absurd, tongue-in-cheek write-ups about the bands performing. Discorder (magazine) has since taken over printing the festival guide.
Since 2008, Music Waste has remained entirely non-profit, and is organized by a group of dedicated volunteers.

Music Waste's "flipping-the-bird" logo and the "goofball" logo were designed by Vancouver artist Sean Maxey.

Music Waste was voted 3rd Best Festival in Vancouver by readers of the Georgia Straight in 2007.

Music Waste 2012 took place 7 to 10 June 2012. It featured over 100 comedy and musical acts at 24 different venues.

2012

Musical Lineup

Wednesday, 6 June

Joseph Blood
The Abraham Singers
Gord Grdina Trio

Thursday, 7 June

Dirty Spells
White Poppy
Greenback High
Capitol 6
B-Lines
Aunts and Uncles
The Godspot
Peace
New Krime
Telefoam
Vincent Parker
Koko
Movieland
Bad Channels
Inherent Vices

Friday, 8 June

Violet Age
Bummer High
Aquanaut
The Shilohs
Teledrome
Hierarchies
WATERS
Woolworm
Thee Ahs
Sleuth
Bleating Hearts
lié
Spider Legs
Hole in My Head
Sex Church
Trail of Broken Treaties
Spring Break
Thin Gaze
Gang Signs
Evy Jane
Gal Gracen
Johnny de Courcy (Solo)
Nam Shub
Cloudsplitter
Hermetic
The Courtneys
Apollo Ghosts
Spell
Trimesters
Good Night Buffalo
Hemogoblin

Saturday, 9 June

Johnny
Koban
Cascadia
Watermelon
Real Boys
NEEDS
The High Drops
Cowards
Jay Arner
Bleach Babes
Sightlines
Fieldhead
Hallow Moon
Kellarissa
Slight Birching
Bertha Cool
Previous Tenants
Slim Fathers
Crystal Swells
Yung Mums
Newport Beach
Victories
Phoenix Thunderbird
Korean Gut
B. A. Johnston
Ketamines
Weathered Pines
The Lost Lovers Brigade
Reverter
Johnny Payne (The Shilos)
L.A. Lights
Konner Whitney (KoKo)
Crystal Dorval (White Poppy)
Big Nothing
Nurse
juvenile hall
The New Values
World Club
Eeek!
Brazilian Money
Slam Dunk
//Zoo
Chris-a-Riffic
Freak Heat Waves
Menopause
Isotopes
Babysitter
Too High Crew

Sunday, 10 June

Horse Girls
Weed
Twin River
Village
Pleasure Cruise
The Ballantynes

References

External links
 Music Waste 

Music festivals established in 1994
Folk festivals in Canada
Music festivals in Vancouver
1994 establishments in British Columbia